George Powell may refer to:

 George Powell (MP) (fl. 1597), for Downton
 George Powell (playwright) (1668–1714), London actor and playwright
 George Gabriel Powell (1710–1779), acting governor of St Helena, and politician in South Carolina
 George Powell (sealer) (1794–1824), English seal hunter and Antarctic explorer
 George Powell (collector) (1842–1882), British translator of Icelandic literature and owner of the Nanteos Cup
 George Powell (golfer) (1869-1927), American golfer
 George Henry Powell (1880–1951), British songwriter
 George Howell (soldier) (1893–1964), Australian recipient of the Victoria Cross
 Gap Powell (George A. Powell, 1898–1989), American football player for Oregon State University
 George Powell (Australian cricketer) (1918–1994), Australian cricketer
 George Powell (Jamaican cricketer) (born 1955), Jamaican cricketer
 George Powell (footballer) (1924–1989), footballer with QPR
 George Powell (musician), member of the American band Pure Prairie League
 George B. Powell (1900–1967), American football coach
 George Powell (British Army officer) (1883–1961), British Army officer and MP

See also
 George Baden-Powell (1847–1898), British Member of Parliament and Arctic explorer
 George Powell-Shedden (1916–1994), Royal Air Force pilot, United Kingdom